is a Japanese multinational corporation based in Osaka. It was established in 1890. The corporation produces many products including tractors and other agricultural machinery, construction equipment, engines, vending machines, pipe, valves, cast metal, pumps, and equipment for water purification, sewage treatment and air conditioning.

Kubota engines are in both diesel and gasoline or spark ignition forms, ranging from the tiny 0.276-liter engine to 6.1-liter engine, in both air-cooled and-liquid cooled designs, naturally-aspirated and forced induction. Cylinder configurations are from single cylinder to inline six cylinders, with single cylinder to four-cylinder being the most common. Those engines are widely used in agricultural equipment, construction equipment, tractors, and marine propulsion.

The corporation is listed on the first section of Tokyo Stock Exchange and is a constituent of the TOPIX 100 and Nikkei 225.

One of its notable contributions was to the construction of the Solar Ark. Kubota is also known for designing 3D graphics chips in the 1990s.

Kubota Tractor Corporation is the American corporation for marketing and distributing Kubota engineered products in the United States, headquartered in Grapevine, TX. This includes products manufactured in the United states by Kubota's American Manufacturing Corporation, called Kubota Manufacturing of America Corporation Headquartered in Gainesville, GA.

References 

Agricultural machinery manufacturers of Japan
Tractor manufacturers of Japan
Electric tractors
Lawn and garden tractors
Construction equipment manufacturers of Japan
Engine manufacturers of Japan
Diesel engine manufacturers
Marine engine manufacturers
Electric motor manufacturers
Pump manufacturers
Defense companies of Japan
Japanese brands
Manufacturing companies based in Osaka
Companies based in Osaka Prefecture
Companies listed on the Osaka Exchange
Companies listed on the Tokyo Stock Exchange
Japanese companies established in 1890
Vehicle manufacturing companies established in 1890
Manufacturing companies established in 1890
Conglomerate companies of Japan
Gas engine manufacturers
Electrical generation engine manufacturers
Automotive transmission makers